Stephen Palmer (born 1 March 1967) is a British orienteer. He ran the third leg in Britain's silver medal winning relay team at the 1993 World Orienteering Championships. Palmer was also a member of the British relay team that won the Nordic Championships in 2001.

Palmer also won the British Orienteering Championships in 1991 and 1999.

He now lives in Borlänge, Sweden.

See also
 British orienteers
 List of orienteers
 List of orienteering events

References

External links
 

1967 births
Living people
British orienteers
Male orienteers
Place of birth missing (living people)
Foot orienteers
World Orienteering Championships medalists
Competitors at the 2001 World Games